Hard Feelings is the sixth and final studio album by American metalcore band Blessthefall. The album was released on March 23, 2018, through Rise Records. It was produced by Tyler Smyth and the band themselves. It is their only album to be released after the band signed to Rise Records in 2018.

Background and promotion 
On January 26, 2018, they announced they have signed a new record deal with Rise Records. In the same month, the ensemble published a music video for "Melodramatic", with a video for "Wishful Sinking" broadcast the month following.

In early 2018, the group toured with Of Mice & Men, Cane Hill, MCSW and Fire from the Gods.

Track listing
All music and lyrics written and performed by Blessthefall.

Personnel

Blessthefall
 Beau Bokan – clean vocals
 Eric Lambert – lead guitar, additional programming, backing clean vocals
 Elliott Gruenberg – rhythm guitar
 Jared Warth – bass guitar, unclean vocals
 Matt Traynor – drums, percussion

Production
 Blessthefall – production
 Tyler Smyth – production, engineering, mixing, mastering
 Michael Sebastian Romero – assistant engineer
 Cory Brunnemann – additional vocal processing
 Matt Good – additional production on "Wishful Sinking", "Find Yourself" and "Sakura Blues"
 Howard Benson – additional production on "Sleepless in Phoenix"

Management
 Matthew Gordner (Rise Records) – A&R

Artwork
 Corey Meyers – art direction & layout, photography
 Lindsey Byrnes – photography, band photo

Charts

References 

2018 albums
Blessthefall albums
Rise Records albums